The 2004 CONCACAF Men's Pre-Olympic Tournament was the eleventh edition of the CONCACAF Pre-Olympic Tournament, the quadrennial, international, age-restricted football tournament organised by CONCACAF to determine which men's under-23 national teams from the North, Central America and Caribbean region qualify for the Olympic football tournament. It was held in Mexico, from 2 and 12 February 2004.

Host nation, Mexico, won the title after a 1–0 win over Costa Rica in the final. As the top two teams, Mexico and Costa Rica both qualified for the 2004 Summer Olympics in Greece as the CONCACAF representatives.

Qualification

Qualified teams
The following teams qualified for the final tournament.

1 Only final tournament.

Venues
Two cities served as the venues for tournament.

Squads

Group stage

Group A

Group B

Knockout stage
All match times listed are CDT (UTC−5), as listed by CONCACAF.

Bracket

Semi-finals
The semi-final winners qualified for the 2004 Summer Olympics.

Third place play-off

Final

Statistics

Goalscorers

Awards
The following awards were given at the conclusion of the tournament.

Final ranking

Qualified teams for Summer Olympics
The following two teams from CONCACAF qualified for the 2004 Summer Olympics.

1 Bold indicates champions for that year. Italic indicates hosts for that year.

References

 
Football qualification for the 2004 Summer Olympics
2004
CONCACAF Men's Olympic Qualifying Tournament
Oly